The 1955 Louisville Cardinals football team was an American football team that represented the University of Louisville as an independent during the 1955 college football season. In their 10th season under head coach Frank Camp, the Cardinals compiled a 7–2 record.

Schedule

References

Louisville
Louisville Cardinals football seasons
Louisville Cardinals football